CenterServ is an International managed server and cloud computing association. The company offers servers in more than 200 cities and countries and operates a privately held and nonprofit think tank institute to develop and improve the data center and cloud computing industry, on the global scale.

History
In early 2000, in the middle of the dot-com bubble, Laflèche Morin started a small communication agency called InexMédia out of his garage apartment in Montreal, Canada. The company began offering a wide range of Web related services. In 2004, InexMédia change its name to Group e-media.com and start offering managed servers and web hosting under the brand name E serves.  When the company began to develop its international managed services and E serves become its primary business, the company was re-formed as CenterServ. In 2009, as the company grew and gained international presence, CenterServ started offering free cloud computing certification to IT professionals and systems administrators, with a particular focus on business ethics and social responsibility for the cloud industry.  Those certifications were used for internal purposes and for private corporation objectives.

During the certification process, CenterServ signs data center access agreement with each member.  This agreement grants CenterServ the access to each member's data center.  In exchange CenterServ would give each member an exclusivity service contract for any hosted solution. Additionally, CenterServ would grant them access to virtual offices mostly offered by RegusTM and other international office space companies.

It is with these agreements that CenterServ decentralized the data center and cloud computing industry.  Each certified responsible systems administrator would be responsible of the CenterServ hosted solution within their own data center. The resulting effects for the data center and cloud industry are higher level of service personalization and unification of data centers all around the globe. By the end of 2014, the company started offering cloud computing franchises.  The franchise model would best fit the need of talented entrepreneur to develop their own business under CenterServ brand, mission and objectives.  They would managed certified CenterServ members for the best interest of their own customers while upgrading the cloud industry service level.

By February 2016, CenterServ has a pool of more than 1500 certified members and IT professional in all fields. CenterServ has access to more than 500 data centers and office space in more than 200 cities and countries. In the future, with both is franchise and certified members network, CenterServ aims to promote innovation, creativity, entrepreneurship and greater accessibility to cloud computing.

In 2016, Stephen Willis joined as the COO for CenterServ USA.

Business Model
CenterServ has two primary lines of business; Cloud Servers and Dedicated Servers offered on a global scale. CenterServ helps design, build, and implement personalized services and offer cloud computing consulting services as part of their service agreements.

Social activity
Although the founders began as MIS administrator and Finance specialist, they found that most companies were often put off by the cloud industry´s lack of services personalization, by centralized decision making purely motivated by profit and also by a lack of data center services accessibility in most parts of the globe.  The founders wanted to turn their venture into a socially responsible company where the cloud industry would benefit from CenterServ activities.

By involving each systems administrator, in return to access to their facilities, would allow for a more personalized and backed by a more unify data center international network.  In order to stay transparent the company would not bind itself with any particular brand, provider, data center, or government.  Meanwhile, to ensure optimal customer service, each contract would need to be signed by a CenterServ certified ethical systems administrator.

CenterServ Think tank gives certifications to systems administrators with an ethical and a socially responsible approach.  The cloud will play an important role for the future. CenterServ is taking over some of the responsibilities such has unifying data center nodes all around the globe and increasing level of cloud computing service innovation and perfection. The CenterServ Private Institute is also responsible of selecting franchisee primarily based on their respect of CenterServ's mission and core value. Selected candidates are retained mostly based on past experience, education, relations and/or ideas and innovation.

CenterServ built its international presence supported by hundreds of systems administrators dispersed all over the globe, allowing for access to most data center facilities Major client contributors in needs of remote geo-location server access help CenterServ unify and normalize the international cloud access and service level.

References

Technology companies of Canada